Kalimba Edwards (born December 26, 1979)  is a former American football defensive end. He was originally drafted by the Detroit Lions in the second round of the 2002 NFL Draft. He played college football at South Carolina.

Edwards has also played for the Oakland Raiders.

College career
Edwards played college football at South Carolina. During his sophomore year, he started every game at defensive end, recording 64 tackles and five sacks, earning an All-American selection. During his junior year, he moved to linebacker and finished third on the team in tackles with 74 and tied for the lead in sacks with seven. He also earned All-American third-team selection by the Associated Press and was a consensus All-Southeastern Conference first-team choice. During his senior year, he played both linebacker and defensive end and was a semifinalist for both the Lombardi Trophy and Butkus Award after finishing the season with 79 tackles and 3.5 sacks. He also earned an All-SEC first-team selection during his senior year.

Professional career

Detroit Lions
Edwards was drafted by the Detroit Lions in the second round of the 2002 NFL Draft. During his rookie year he played in all 16 games and led the team in sacks with 6.5. In 2005, he led the Lions in sacks for the second time with seven. The Lions released him on March 13, 2008. He finished his career with the Lions with 160 tackles and 26 sacks.

Oakland Raiders
On March 28, 2008 Edwards was signed by the Oakland Raiders to a two-year, $5 million contract.

On February 20, 2009, Edwards was released by the Raiders. He finished his only season with the team starting 11 of 14 games, recording 48 tackles and five sacks.

References

External links
Detroit Lions bio
Oakland Raiders bio

1979 births
Living people
People from East Point, Georgia
African-American players of American football
American football defensive ends
South Carolina Gamecocks football players
Detroit Lions players
Oakland Raiders players
Sportspeople from Fulton County, Georgia
Players of American football from Georgia (U.S. state)
21st-century African-American sportspeople
20th-century African-American sportspeople